Marie of Anjou (14 October 1404 – 29 November 1463) was Queen of France as the spouse of King Charles VII from 1422 to 1461. She served as regent and presided over the council of state several times during the absence of the king.

Life
Marie was the eldest daughter of Louis II of Anjou, claimant to the throne of Naples, and Yolande of Aragon, claimant to the throne of Aragon.

Marie was betrothed to her second cousin Charles, son and heir apparent of Charles VI of France, in 1413. When a Burgundian force took Paris in 1418, Charles left her stranded, but she was taken by John the Fearless to Saumur to be reunited with him. However, Charles failed to arrive for the agreed rendezvous.

The wedding took place on 18 December 1422 at Bourges. The marriage made Marie Queen of France, but she was never crowned.  Her spouse's victory in the Hundred Years War owed a great deal to the support he received from Marie's family, notably from her mother Yolande of Aragon.

Queen
Queen Marie presided over the council of state several times in the absence of the king, during which she had power of attorney as regent and signed acts in the position of "lieutenant of the king" (April 1434). 
She made several pilgrimages, such as Puy with the king in 1424, and Mount St Michel by herself in 1447.

Marie and Charles had fourteen children, but her spouse's affection was primarily directed towards his mistress, Agnès Sorel, originally Marie's lady in waiting, who became official mistress to the king in 1444 and played a dominant role at court until her death in 1450, somewhat eclipsing the queen.

Robert Blondel composed the allegorical Treatise of the "Twelve Perils of Hell" for Queen Marie in 1455.

Queen dowager
In 1461, Charles VII died and was succeeded by their son Louis XI, making Marie queen dowager. She was granted the Chateau of Amboise and the income from Brabant by her son.

During the winter of 1462-63, Marie of Anjou made a pilgrimage to Santiago de Compostela. It has been speculated that she had a mission in Spain as secret ambassador for her son, due to the political situation at the time and the fact that she made the pilgrimage during winter time, when the roads were so bad that such trips were normally avoided if possible.

She died at the age of 59 on 29 November 1463 at the Cistercian Abbaye de Chateliers-en-Poitou (now in Nouvelle-Aquitaine region) on her return. She is buried in the basilica of Saint-Denis alongside her spouse.

Issue
Marie and Charles had:

Louis XI of France (3 July 1423-30 August 1483), married firstly, Margaret of Scotland, no issue. Married secondly, Charlotte of Savoy, had issue.
John (d.19 September 1426)
Radegonde (1425 or August 1428-19 March 1445), betrothed to Sigismund, Archduke of Austria on 22 July 1430
Catherine (1428-13 July 1446), married Charles the Bold, no issue
James (1432- 2 March 1437)
Yolande (23 September 1434-23/29 August 1478), married Amadeus IX, Duke of Savoy, had issue
Joan (4 May 1435-4 May 1482), married John II, Duke of Bourbon
Philip (4 February 1436-11 June 1436)
Margaret (May 1437-24 July 1438) 
Joan (7 September 1438 - 26 December 1446), twin of Marie
Mary (7 September 1438 - 14 February 1439), twin of Joan
Isabella (d.1441)
Magdalena (1 December 1443 - 21 January 1495), married Gaston of Foix, Prince of Viana, had issue.
Charles (12 December 1446 - 24 May 1472)

References

Sources

|-

1404 births
1463 deaths
Burials at the Basilica of Saint-Denis
Armagnac faction
French queens consort
Dauphines of Viennois
House of Valois-Anjou
15th-century French women
People from Angers
15th-century French people
15th-century women rulers
People of Byzantine descent
Queen mothers